Peillonnex is a commune in the Haute-Savoie department and Auvergne-Rhône-Alpes region of south-eastern France.

The inhabitants are called Peillonnexois.

Places and monuments 
 Stiges du château des sires de Faucigny
 The priory of Peillonnex, whose village has preserved a part.
 The church of Peillonnex, is dated from the twelfth century, it is inscribed in the register of historical monuments. Its architecture combines Romanesque art and Savoyard baroque art. A small walking tour "wandering around the priory" takes a look at the surrounding landscape and the architecture of the church.

Tourist attractions near Peillonnex

Grand sites of France 
 Cirque de Sixt Fer a Cheval (37km) [Map]

Villages 
 Yvoire (27km)
 Sixt-Fer-à-Cheval (32km)

National Monuments 
 Voltaire Chateau (25km) [Map]

Recommended detour towns 
 La Roche-sur-Foron (9km) [Map]
 Sallanches (29km)

Regional Natural Parcs 
 Haut-Jura (48km) [Map]

Remarkable gardens 
 Le Labyrinthe - Jardin des Cinq Sens (27km) [Map]
 Jardin botanique alpin La Jaÿsinia (27km) [Map]
 Jardin d'eau de pré curieux (32km) [Map]

Sites of natural beauty 
 Mole (6km) [Map]
 Cascade de la Diomaz (12km) [Map]
 Col de la Colombière (17km) [Map]
 Col de Romme (19km) [Map]
 Roc d'Enfer (19km) [Map]
 Mont Veyrier (30km) [Map]
 Cascade du Rouget (32km) [Map]
 Lac d'Annecy (34km) [Map]
 Roc de Chere (34km) [Map]
 Lac d'Anterne (36km) [Map]
 Gorges du Fier (37km) [Map]
 Cirque du Fer-à-Cheval (37km) [Map]
 Col de la Faucille (38km) [Map]
 Lac Cornu (41km) [Map]
 Le Brévent (42km) [Map]
 Lac de Lamoura (42km) [Map]
 Glacier des Bossons (47km) [Map]
 Cascade de la queue de cheval (47km) [Map]
 Montenvers (47km) [Map]
 Lac des Rousses (47km) [Map]
 Aiguille du Midi (48km) [Map]
 Mont Blanc (50km) [Map]
 Mer de Glace (50km) [Map]
 Lac de l'Abbaye (57km) [Map]
 Lacs d'Étival (61km) [Map]

Towns of art and history 
 Annecy (32km)

Villages in bloom 4* (fr: ville fleurie) 
 Evian-les-Bains (35km) [Map]
 Megeve (36km)

See also
Communes of the Haute-Savoie department

References

Communes of Haute-Savoie